Traité de l'harmonie réduite à ses principes naturels (Treatise on Harmony reduced to its natural principles) is a music treatise written by Jean-Philippe Rameau.  It was first published in Paris in 1722 by Jean-Baptiste-Christophe Ballard.

The Treatise describes music and how to write it based on the tonal system used today in classical music.  It uses the modern major and minor keys to teach readers what to do to achieve good-sounding music based on the 12 tone music scale.

The Treatise is divided into four books:
Book I:   On the relationship between Harmonic Ratios and Proportions.
Book II:  On the Nature and Properties of Chords; and on Everything which may be used to make music perfect.
Book III: Principles of Composition.
Book IV:  Principles of Accompaniment.

Rameau's treatise features frequent passages similar in both subject matter and wording to passages in other publications by other authors.

See also
New System of Musical Theory (by Rameau)

Further reading

External links 
 Modern online edition (digitized by Indiana University): I, II, III, IV, Corrections 
 1722 edition on Gallica 

1722 books
Treatises